Spheterista argentinotata is a moth of the family Tortricidae. It was first described by John Frederick Gates Clarke in 1978. It is endemic to the island of Hawaii.

External links

Archipini
Endemic moths of Hawaii